The Savannah pebblesnail, scientific name Somatogyrus tenax, is a species of freshwater snail, an aquatic gastropod mollusk in the family Hydrobiidae. This species is endemic to the United States. Somatogyrus tenax may actually be a junior synonym of Somatogyrus virginicus, although the taxonomy remains in dispute.

Sources

Endemic fauna of the United States
Molluscs of the United States
Somatogyrus
Freshwater snails
Gastropods described in 1969
Taxonomy articles created by Polbot